Wild Wild World is a 1960 Warner Bros. Merrie Melodies cartoon directed by Robert McKimson. The short was released on February 27, 1960.

The film is a spoof of the 1955-1958 television series Wide Wide World, hosted by Dave Garroway. In the cartoon, "Cave Darroway" presents a recently discovered film taken during the Cro-Magnon era. Because of the long lead time in producing an animated cartoon, the TV program which inspired the cartoon had already been canceled when the cartoon was released.  The cartoon is available on DVD as a bonus short on disc four of Looney Tunes Golden Collection: Volume 6.

The documentary was filmed in the "Geo-Goshical Year 75,000,000 B.C." (satirizing the International Geophysical Year 1957-'58), in breathtaking Cromagnonscope.  Cromagnonscope last appeared in the cartoon Pre-Hysterical Hare.

Plot 
Cave Darroway presents a recently discovered "film documentary of the Geo-Goshical Year 75,000,000 B.C.". In the documentary, as three cavemen try to kill a dinosaur, the discovery of fire, transportations, use of the boomerang, entertainment, a haircut, department stores and the use of its elevator are comically shown. Finally the three cavemen from earlier try to kill a dinosaur again, but it shows them a sign that says "Friday (fish day)". They then decide to fish, but are swallowed by the fish. The documentary ends and Cave Darroway decides to take a coffee break. However, when he gets into an elevator, it turns out that it works like the one seen earlier in the documentary.

References

External links
Wild Wild World listing in IMDB
Wild Wild World listing in TV.com

1960 films
1960 animated films
1960 short films
1960s parody films
Merrie Melodies short films
Films directed by Robert McKimson
Films scored by Milt Franklyn
1960s Warner Bros. animated short films
1960s English-language films
Animated films about cavemen